The 39th New Brunswick Legislative Assembly represented New Brunswick between April 4, 1940, and July 10, 1944.

William George Clark served as Lieutenant-Governor of New Brunswick.

F. A. McGrand was chosen as speaker.

The Liberal Party led by Allison Dysart formed the government. Dysart was replaced by John B. McNair in March 1940.

History

Members 

Notes:

References 
 Canadian Parliamentary Guide, 1944, PG Normandin

Terms of the New Brunswick Legislature
1939 establishments in New Brunswick
1944 disestablishments in New Brunswick
20th century in New Brunswick